Destination Marfa is a 2021 American science fiction film written and directed by Andy Stapp and starring Tony Todd, Stelio Savante, Tracy Perez, Richard Riehle, and Neil Sandilands. In 2021 Andy Stapp was awarded Hollywood's Best First-Time Filmmaker The film is inspired by the legendary phenomenon of the Marfa lights which are a popular tourist attraction year round culminating with a celebration in the form of the Marfa Lights Festival. The film has won both domestically & internationally Best Writer x 2, Best Director x 6, Best Trailer x 2, Best Sci-fi feature x 7, Best Horror, Best Actor x 2, Best Editor x 2, Best Visual Effects x 2,  Best Debut Film, Exceptional Merit in Film, International Platinum Film, Best Feature at European Cinema, Best Sound Design at European International, Best Producer, Honorable mention in Athens, Greece, and an Honorable Mention at Hollywood New Directors. Destination Marfa was in the top 5% success rate for selections at movie festivals in 2021 as well as 2022. It was selected at Manhattan, New York Filmfest, Toronto, Canada International Filmfest, Montreal, Canada Independent Filmfest, Los Angeles, California Scifi FilmFest, North Hollywood, California Cinefest, Athens, Greece , Miami, Florida, Seattle, Washington, Kilgore, Texas, International Filmfest in Italy, World Carnival Filmfest in Singapore, Ediplay Filmfest in Paris, France, Dubai, UAE, Colorado Springs, Colorado, West Virginia, Boston, Maryland, Reims, France, India, Newark, New Jersey, Las Vegas, Nevada, Austin, Texas, Italy, Stanley Kubrick Film Awards, Hollywood New Directors, and The So You Think You Can Direct/Act Competition in Delaware.

Plot
Four friends on their way home from a Texas cookoff weekend stop at a gas station, where they encounter a fortune teller. They ultimately decide to make a last stop in Marfa, Texas, in the hopes of viewing the strange Marfa Lights.

Cast

Production
The film was written, directed, and executive produced by American filmmaker Andy Stapp.

It was shot on-location in Texas, including in the city of Marfa and in the West Texas towns of Plainview, Valentine and Lockney. In Marfa, The El Paisano Hotel was used both as a shooting location and accommodation for several of the cast and crew. Prada Marfa was also used as the location where the four lifelong friends Eden, Matthew, Eric and Allie pick up the hitchhiker, Vincent.

Release 
On November 23, 2020, it was announced that Fairway Film Alliance had acquired worldwide sales rights to the film.

Joblo.com released the first clip and trailer of the film in March 2021.

Deadline Hollywood announced that the film will be released on August 3, 2021, through SP Releasing.

Broadway World announced the film's premiere at the Manhattan Film Festival where it took home the best horror film award in June 2021.

References

External links 
 

2021 science fiction films
American science fiction films
Films shot in Texas
2020s English-language films
2020s American films